Swamp Thing is an American superhero horror television series created by Gary Dauberman and Mark Verheiden for DC Universe, based on the DC Comics character of the same name. Derek Mears portrays the eponymous Swamp Thing, a plant-elemental creature who fights malevolent forces around a Louisiana swamp with the help of medical doctor Abby Arcane (Crystal Reed).

The series premiered on May 31, 2019, and consisted of 10 episodes. Shortly after its premiere, DC Universe announced that Swamp Thing had been canceled. The remaining episodes were released on DC Universe until the series' conclusion on August 2, 2019.

Premise
Abby Arcane returns home to Marais, Louisiana, to investigate a deadly swamp-borne virus, where she develops a bond with disgraced scientist Alec Holland. After Holland tragically dies, Abby discovers the mysteries of the swamp and that Holland might not be dead after all.

Cast and characters

Main
 Crystal Reed as Abigail "Abby" Arcane: A CDC doctor investigating a horrific life-threatening epidemic in her hometown while facing her past again. Melissa Collazo portrays teenage Abby.
 Virginia Madsen as Maria Sunderland: The wife of Avery Sunderland, whose grief over the loss of her daughter, Shawna, resurfaces when Abby returns home, and draws Maria into the supernatural mysteries of the swamp.
 Andy Bean as Alec Holland: A disgraced biologist working for Avery. Murdered when he starts to uncover an illegal operation in the swamp, his memories survive inside of Swamp Thing.
 Derek Mears as Swamp Thing: A plant-based entity created from the memories of Alec Holland. Possessing elemental control of vegetation and regenerative abilities, he attempts to defend the swamp, the town, and the natural world at large.
 Henderson Wade as Matt Cable: A police officer along with his mother, Lucilia, who finds himself in dire straits when supernatural events begin to threaten the town. He is also a childhood friend of Abby.
 Maria Sten as Liz Tremayne: A local newspaper reporter and bartender who is a close childhood friend of Abby Arcane.
 Jeryl Prescott as Nimue Inwudu / Xanadu: A blind fortune teller whose psychic abilities can reveal the future.
 Will Patton as Avery Sunderland: A prominent businessman in Marais, who, while publicly giving back to the community, is determined to harness the power of the swamp for profit as a pharmaceutical cornucopia. He was also the adoptive parent to Abby Arcane after her mother died.
 Jennifer Beals as Lucilia Cable: The "tough as nails and pragmatic" sheriff of Marais with a strong devotion to her son, Matt.
 Kevin Durand as Jason Woodrue: A biogeneticist, brought in to study the properties of the swamp, leading him to become fixated on unlocking its potential.

Recurring
 Leonardo Nam as Harlan Edwards: A CDC specialist who is Abby's second-in-command
 Elle Graham as Susie Coyle: A young girl who is diagnosed with "Green Flu", appears to have a mysterious connection to Swamp Thing, and befriends Abby
 Given Sharp as Shawna Sunderland: Abby's childhood friend and Maria and Avery's deceased daughter, who appears in both flashbacks and as a ghost to her mother Maria
 Ian Ziering as Daniel Cassidy / Blue Devil: A former stuntman who, after becoming semi-famous playing the demonic Blue Devil in a film, looks to regain his former fame
 Selena Anduze as Caroline Woodrue: A scientist and Jason Woodrue's wife who has Alzheimer's disease
 Macon Blair as Phantom Stranger
 Al Mitchell as Delroy Tremayne: Liz's father
 Michael Beach as Nathan Ellery

Guest
 RJ Cyler as Jones
 Tim Russ as Dr. Chowodury, a doctor at the Marais hospital
 Micah Fitzgerald as Munson / the Rot
 Adrienne Barbeau as Dr. Palomar, the assistant director of the CDC. Barbeau previously appeared in the 1982 film adaptation of Swamp Thing as Alice Cable, an amalgamation of Abby Arcane and Matt Cable.
 Jake Busey as Shaw

Episodes

Production

Development
On May 2, 2018, it was announced that DC Universe had given the production a script-to-series order. Mark Verheiden and Gary Dauberman were expected to write the first episode of the series and executive produce alongside James Wan, Michael Clear. Rob Hackett was set to serve as a co-producer. Production companies involved with the series were slated to include Atomic Monster Productions and Warner Bros. Television. On September 4, 2018, it was reported that Len Wiseman would direct the series' first episode in addition to serving as an executive producer.

Despite being released on DC Universe, the series does not exist in the same fictional universe as the service's other live-action series, including Titans and Doom Patrol. On June 6, 2019, the series was canceled one week after its premiere aired. Before the series' cancellation, there were plans for a three-season arc and to introduce Justice League Dark and create a spin-off based on that team.

Casting
In September 2018, it was announced that Crystal Reed and Maria Sten had been cast in the main roles of Abby Arcane and Liz Tremayne, respectively. Jennifer Beals was also announced in the recurring role of Sheriff Lucilia Cable, although she would later be revealed to be part of the main cast. In late October and early November 2018, more series regulars were revealed, with Jeryl Prescott cast as Madame Xanadu, Virginia Madsen cast as Maria Sunderland, Will Patton cast as Avery Sunderland. Andy Bean cast as Alec Holland with Derek Mears as the Swamp Thing, Henderson Wade cast as Matt Cable, and Kevin Durand cast as Jason Woodrue.

Also in December 2018, Ian Ziering joined the cast in the recurring role of Daniel Cassidy / Blue Devil, and a month later, Leonardo Nam was cast as Harlan Edwards in a recurring role.

Filming
Principal photography for the series commenced in early November 2018 in Wilmington, North Carolina, and wrapped on May 6, 2019.

Cancellation
On April 17, 2019, it was announced that production for the series had been unexpectedly cut short due to creative differences with DC Universe's parent company WarnerMedia, thus reducing the original episode order from 13 to 10 episodes. Further reports stated the series had been canceled due to budget shortfalls after the expected level of tax rebates offered by the state of North Carolina were substantially reduced. A representative from DC Universe stated that the streaming service was being re-evaluated and that there were no plans for a second season. When asked why specifically the show was canceled, the spokesman responded, "Unfortunately, we are not in a position to answer at this time."

Mears described the cancellation as a "heartbreaker" and felt the decision to cancel the show showed a "lack of respect" on DC's part. He added that members of the production had been told up until the cancellation "how amazing everything was... So it's a weird nebulous space that we're all in now because we don't know officially why that would happen, or why they canceled it." In mid-2019, a movement with the hashtag #SaveSwampThing began spreading on social media shortly after the series was cancelled in an attempt to save the series. Mears also showed his support of the movement. With The CW network acquiring the broadcast rights to the series, The CW president Mark Pedowitz did not rule out the possibility of renewing the series for a second season, saying, "that would be a discussion for Warner Bros. and the CW. But at this time, Swamp Thing is just the episodes we have." In January 2021, Pedowitz said it was unlikely the series would return on The CW but did state there was a slim possibility of Swamp Thing appearing on other Arrowverse series, such as Legends of Tomorrow.

Release
Swamp Thing premiered May 31, 2019, on DC Universe. Despite being canceled not long after its premiere, DC Universe continued to release the remaining episodes of the series, with the finale being released on August 2, 2019. Swamp Thing: The Complete Series was released digitally on December 2, 2019, and on DVD and Blu-ray on February 11, 2020.

In May 2020, The CW acquired the broadcast rights to the series. It began airing on the network on October 6, 2020, and concluded on December 22, 2020.

Reception

Critical response
On Rotten Tomatoes, the series holds a 92% approval rating based on 39 reviews, with an average rating of 7.32/10. The website's critical consensus reads, "By leaning into the horror of it all, Swamp Thing swims deep into the trenches of this strange world and returns with a scary good TV show." Metacritic, which uses a weighted average, assigned the series a score of 69 out of 100 based on reviews from 6 critics, indicating "generally favorable reviews".

Accolades
The series was nominated at the 2019 Saturn Awards for Best Streaming Superhero Television Series. Matthew Llewellyn as music editor on "The Anatomy Lesson" was nominated for the Outstanding Achievement in Sound Editing – Music Score and Musical for Episodic Short Form Broadcast Media award at the 2019 MPSE Golden Reel Awards.

Arrowverse

Swamp Thing, as depicted in the series, makes a cameo appearance in the Arrowverse crossover event "Crisis on Infinite Earths" through archival footage of Mears as the character. The event depicts Swamp Thing as being set on the world of Earth-19.

References

External links
 

 
2010s American drama television series
2010s American horror television series
2019 American television series debuts
2019 American television series endings
American superhero television series
DC Universe (streaming service) original programming
English-language television shows
Horror drama television series
Television shows based on DC Comics
Television series by Warner Bros. Television Studios
Television shows filmed in North Carolina 
Television shows filmed in Wilmington, North Carolina
Television shows set in Louisiana
Superhero horror television shows